Garst may refer to:

People
 David Garst (1926–2006), American agriculturalist
 Roswell Garst (1898–1977), American agriculturalist
 Warren Garst (1850–1924), American politician
 Mary Garst (born 1928), American cattle breeder in the Iowa Women's Hall of Fame
 Shannon Garst (1894–1981), American author, lived in Douglas, Wyoming

Places
 Garst House (Greenville, Ohio), a museum, listed on the National Register of Historic Places (NRHP) in Darke County
 Roswell and Elizabeth Garst Farmstead Historic District, a farm in Guthrie County, Iowa, United States
 John Garst House, a historic place in Ashland County, Ohio, United States
 Garst Airport, in Nishnabotna Township, Atchison County, Missouri, United States

Other
 Garst Seed Company, American producer of hybrid seeds

See also
Gorst, a surname, including a list of people with the name 
Garston (disambiguation)